The 2008 Duke Blue Devils football team represented the Duke University in the 2008 NCAA Division I FBS football season. The team was led by head coach David Cutcliffe. They played their homes games at Wallace Wade Stadium in Durham, North Carolina.

Schedule

Personnel

Coaching staff

Roster

Game summaries

James Madison

Northwestern

Navy

Virginia

at Georgia Tech

Miami (FL)

at Vanderbilt

at Wake Forest

NC State

at Clemson

at Virginia Tech

North Carolina

Season facts
Duke's four wins equaled the team's win total from the previous four seasons combined
According to the Sagarin rankings, Duke faced the second toughest schedule in the country
Of the 11 NCAA Football Bowl Subdivision teams the Blue Devils played against, 10 became bowl-eligible (Virginia fell just short at 5-7).  The 12th team, James Madison, went 12-1 in the Championship Subdivision.
Duke place-kickers went 13-for-18 in field goal attempts, a 72.2 percent clip that was a team's best since 1998
Punter Kevin Jones ranked third in the ACC with a 40.8-yard average per kick
For the first time in history, attendance was over 30,000 for four home games
Duke has finished last or tied for last in the ACC for five consecutive seasons and six out of the last seven

Statistics

Team

Scores by quarter

Offense

Rushing

Passing

Receiving

Defense

Special teams

References

Duke
Duke Blue Devils football seasons
Duke Blue Devils football